Presidential elections were held in Kiribati on 22 June 2020. Incumbent President Taneti Maamau of the Tobwaan Kiribati Party was re-elected with 59% of the vote.

Campaign
Relations with China and Taiwan was the main issue during the elections, with Maamau having switched Kiribati's recognition to China from Taiwan, while Berina seen as more sympathetic toward Taiwan. The elections were seen by many as a critical test for the Chinese Communist Party's expansionist foreign policy.

Results
The results were declared on 23 June 2020 by Chief Justice John Muria at the Ministry of Justice headquarters in South Tarawa. Maamau won the election with 59% of the vote, receiving a majority in 16 of the 23 constituencies, while Berina finished first in seven constituencies.

References

Kiribati
Presidential election
Kiribati
Presidential elections in Kiribati